Norman Music Festival (NMF) is an annual three-day American music festival created by Robert Ruiz, Wilmari Ruiz, Marta Burcham, Jim Wilson, Quentin Bomgardner, Kent Johnson, Jonathan Fowler, and Xian Pitt that takes place in downtown Norman, Oklahoma.  Each year it highlights performances from many different genres of music.  It has indoor and outdoor venues with musicians performing throughout the days and nights. Founded in 2008, in has grown to include food and art from local vendors. In 2013 an estimated 60,000 people attended the festival, which is free to the public. A business survey conducted by the Norman Arts Council that year estimated that the economic impact of NMF to the city of Norman was over $2.5 million.

NMF is held annually on the third Thursday through Saturday of April; if the traditional festival weekend conflicts with the Easter holiday, it shifts to the fourth weekend of the month to avoid conflicts with other Norman festivities.

Norman Music Festival
Founded as a one-day event, NMF has grown to encompass three full days of music and arts, with attendance growing significantly each year. Beginning in 2009, the NMF logo added a number to the end of its acronym to denote the number of occurrences of the festival. For example, the 2009 NMF was known as NMF2, 2010 was NMF3, and so on.

NMF is organized by volunteers and funded via donations from private citizens and nearby businesses. It is now sponsored by the Norman Arts Council.

2008
The first NMF was a one-day event; it was not known if it would be repeated. An estimated crowd of 15,000 attended.

Lineup
Main Stage: Evangelicals, Colourmusic, The Octopus Project, British Sea Power, Chainsaw Kittens, Polyphonic Spree

2009
Known as NMF2, it was held on April 25. Over 25,000 people attended, prompting organizers to consider expanding the number of days in subsequent festivals.

Lineup
Main Stage: El Paso Hot Button, Student Film, The Absolute, Sherree Chamberlain, Stardeath and White Dwarfs, Sugar and Gold, Man Man, Starlight Mints, of Montreal

2010
The 2010 festival, NMF3, expanded to two full days and was held on April 24–25. Organizers, having partnered with Dustbowl Arts Market, expanded it to include arts and crafts. NMF3 garnered statewide attention when Governor of Oklahoma Brad Henry signed a proclamation declaring April 25 "Norman Music Festival Day." Over 38,000 people attended.  The festival chairman was Quentin Bomgardner.

Saturday lineup
The Brewhouse Stage: Jacuzzi Lifeguards, Zach Winters, Sahid Benalioulhaj and family, Possum Brothers, Zuni, Miracord, Lost at Sea, Mama Sweet, Klipspringer, Love Button, Z'Ebre, MONTU

Dreamer Concepts Stage: Bungalouski, The Stumblers, P.O.T.E., ethios4, DJ Steve Morton, Sick Nick, Oklahoma Electronic Music Consortium

Latin Stage: Son del Barrio, Tekumbe, Social Klash

Michelangelo's Coffee & Wine Bar Stage: Farrel Droke, Tod J. Barrett, John Houser, Jim Madsen, Tracy Reed, Russell Kabir, Katie Mariah, Mike "Walker Run" Giroux, Shane Henry, Anvil Salute

Opolis Stage: Kite Flying Robot, Junebug Spade, Locust Avenue, Depth & Current, Hush Hush Commotion, Colourmusic, Octopus Project

Red Room Stage: Berkeley to DC, Blaise, Saturday Sirens, A Picture of the World, Unmarked Cars, J-Matic, The City Lives, BradChad Porter, Dan Skaggs, Griff Pippin, Spencer Hicks, Stan Stillman, Leah Kayajanian, Cameron Buchholtz, Kristen Rand, T.R. DeGraw, Derek Smith

Sonder Music Stage: Anthony Nagid Quartet, Off Boyd Jazz, Ivan Peña, Fah-Beyon, Circe

Sooner Theatre Stage: Student Film, Stephen Rawlings, Traindodge, Tony Romanello & the Black Jackets, Rainbows Are Free, Evangelicals

Sunday lineup
The Brewhouse Stage: The Candyguns, Wondernaut, The Lily Guild, Green Corn Revival, Maggie McClure, Ali Harter, Sherree Chamberlain, Audra Mae

Dreamer Concepts Stage: Loss of Season, Brian Blackwood, Never Satisfied, Palit, Lands Bejeweled, Tiger Blood, Dylan Hammett, Resident Funk, Camille Harp

Jägermeister Stage: Queens of Monroe, Chuck Allen Floyd, The HillBenders, Mike Hosty, Li'l Cap'n Travis, Those Darlins, The Gourds, James McMurty, Leon Russell

Little Rockers Kid Stage: McMichael Music, Norman Music Institute, Balcum Rancum Puppetry, The Studio of the Sooner Theatre, Sugar Free Allstars, Sonder Music, Dance & Art, OU Steel Drum Band

Main Stage: Gentle Ghost, Mayola, Dead Sea Choir, Jabee, Grupo Fantasma, Edan (with guest Dagha), The Sword, Electric Six, Dirty Projectors

Michelangelo's Coffee & Wine Bar Stage: Tom Crider, Matt Stratton, Gregg Standridge & Robert Bartlett, Daddy Love, Post Arcadia, Dante and The Hawks, Dustin Prinz, Chad Dorough, Steven Pitman & Katie Mariah

Opolis Stage: Brother Gruesome, Euclid Crash, Debris', The Toothman, Brother Bear, Ghost of Monkshood, Deerpeople

Red Room Stage: Quantum Turbo, Radio Deception, Venus Bogards, Hiphopapotamus, 8 Bit Cynics, Scales of Motion, Algebra, Eagle Claw

Sooner Theatre Stage: The Non

2011
The 2011 festival, known as NMF4, expanded to three days and took place April 28–30.  The Walkmen was the headliner. Robert Ruiz was the festival chairman.

Below is an alphabetized list of performers and stages adapted from the NM4 website.

Thursday Lineup

Bill and Dees Stage: The Electric Primadonnas, The Needles, The Oh Johnny! Girls, The Purple Church, Thirteen Stars

Blackwatch Stage:  Ben Kilgore, Brother Gruesome, Gentle Ghost, Sherree Chamberlain, Unwed Sailor

Bluebonnet Stage: Gregg Standridge, O Fidelis, The Gunship, The Rum Fellows, TheLonzoDogBand

Brewhouse Stage: Chase Kerby, Edgar Cruz, Green Corn Revival, Head Cabinets, Psymbience, The Nghiems

Michelangelos Stage: Indoor - Jerry Brooks/Frank Lawrence, John Houser, Nathan Brown, Russell Kabir, The Fountain and the Figurehead

Opolis Stage (indoor) - Catching Chloe, Crown Imperial, Depth & Current, Man-Made Objects, Saturday Sirens, Student Film, The Gentle Art of Floating, The Venditos

Friday Lineup

Bill and Dees Stage: Boy Wonder, John Wayne's Bitches, Modern Rock Diaries, MOON, People, People, Rico Muerte, RUDE AMPS

Bison Witches - Lands Bejeweled

Bluebonnet Stage: Black Canyon, Brad Fielder, Flatland Travelers, J.D. Thompsoni, The Damn Quails, Will Gardner

Blackwatch Stage: Brine Webb, Other Lives, The Burning Hotels, The Pretty Black Chains, The Workweek, Vandevander, Unwed Sailor

Brewhouse Stage: Black Jackets, Daniel Walcher, John Moreland, Love Button, Ottrepop, Psychotic Reaction, Tony Romanello

Dreamer Concepts Stage: Bungalouski, Frequency Jones, Grey Engraved, Jeff Hobbs & the Jacks, straightshooter, The East Dallas Shufflers, Travis Wackerly and the PostOkies

Guestroom Stage: Bottle Service, Dikes of Holland, Easy Lovers, Followed By Static, Kerai-Pantsu, Love Collector, Lumerians, Negro Allowance, Shitty/Awesome, Skating Polly, 
Stuffies/Shitty Beach Boys, The Boom Bang, The Copperheads, The Dead Space

Latin Stage: Alegria Real, Los Hollywood, Monte Negro

Michelangelos Stage: Indoor - Darden Pierce, David Henson, Farrel Droke, Ryan Welton, Tomcriders

Opolis Stage (indoor - unplugged) - Ali Harter, Blue Valley Farmer, Luna Moth, Oz Davidson, Penny Hilary, The Neighborhood, Thee Bad Newes, Travis Linville

Opolis Stage (outdoor) - Brother Bear, Locust Avenue, Stardeath and White Dwarf, The Wurly Birds, White Denim

Red Room Stage: Day One, fos, Horse Thief, Mind The Fox, Of The Tower, The Rockettops, Watersparks

Sonder Jazz Stage: Anthony Nagid Jazz Quartet, Ivan's Hot Six, Laura Wiederhoeft & Kyle Reid, Open Jazz Session, Pa Pa Win

Sooner Theatre Stage: FRMR, Mama Sweet, Ryan Lawson, The Hex, The Mimsies

Spectacle Stage: Ashley Lin & Madisen Cary Duet, Ashtanga AcroYoga and Magic, Candela Latin Dancers, Dazzlers, Habibi Yal Albi (Marjan's troupe), Julia's Academy of International Dance, Killer Drum (Marjan solo), Le Tepes Rouge, Norman High School Dancers, Ouija & The UniNauts, Prairie Folk Circus

The Garage Stage: Comedian - Anthony Cavazos, Comedian - BradChad Porter, Comedian - Cameron Buchholtz, Comedian - Dan Skaggs, Comedian - Derek Smith, Comedian - James Nghiem, Comedian - Michael Priest, Comedian - OKC Improv, Comedian - Rundus, Comedian - Ryan Drake, Comedian - Spencer Hicks, Comedian - Zach Smith

Saturday Lineup

Ashtanga Yoga Studio Stage: Acrobatic Yoga and Magic Show with Andrew Eppler, Ashtavakra, DJ Sick Nick, DJ Steve Morton, Proprietors of the Earth

Bill and Dees Stage: And There Stand Empires, Apollo, Daniel(s), Klipspringer, Luna Moth, Romero, Scales of Motion, Traindodge

Blackwatch Stage: BRONCHO, Debris', Jacob Abello, Kite Flying Robot, Native Lights, OK Sweetheart

Bluebonnet Stage: Acoustic Ross, Amy Lee and the Second Line, Bloody Ol Mule, Bulletproof Tiger, Carter Sampson & Joe Mack, Dr. Pants, Resident Funk, The Dead Armadillos

Brewhouse Stage: Big Brown & "Slim", Camille Harp, Hush Hush Commotion, Josh Roberts, K.C. Clifford, Kylie Morgan Band, Riley Jantzen and the Spirits, The Lily Guild

Dreamer Concepts Stage: Kale Hunter, Oklahoma Scottish Pipes & Drums group, Post Arcadia, Switchblade Rosie, The Barrelhouse Revelers, The Pizza Thieves, The Whiskey Trio
  
Jägermeister Stage: Ali Harter, Audra Mae, Beau Jennings, Dorian Small, Keller Williams, MONTU, Pidgin Band, The Trishas, Travis Linville

Little Rocker Kids Stage: Brendan Parker, Monty Harper, OU Jazz Band, Young Musicians Showcase: McMichael Music, Young Musicians Showcase: Norman Music Institute,
Young Musicians Showcase: Sonder Music, Dance & Art, Young Musicians Showcase: The Studio of the Sooner Theatre

Main Stage: Black Joe Lewis & The Honeybears, Foot Patrol, Peelander-Z, Penny Hill Party, The Fortune Tellers, The Non, The Walkmen, Ty Segall

Michelangelos Stage: Indoor - Denver Duncan, Dustin Prinz and Anna Kinder, John Calvin, Scott Hartman (Aaron Squirrel), The Samurai Conquistadors, The Simoleons, Tod Barrett

Michelangelos Stage: Outdoor - Guitar & Mandolin Orchestra, Jim Madsen (S.W.A.N.), Kerry Folsom, Matthew Stratton, Richard 'Daddy' Love, Tracy Reed, Zach Walchuk

Opolis Stage (indoor - unplugged) - Brine Webb, Bulletproof Tiger, Carter Sampson & Joe Mack, Jeff Richardson, Jesse Aycock & Paul Benjaman, Ryan Lindsey,
Seth Mccarroll, The Damn Quails

Opolis Stage (outdoor) - Gum, Junebug Spade, Rainbows Are Free, Unmarked Cars, Zombie vs. Shark

Sooner Theatre Stage: aDDLib, Algebra, Colour Revolt, Emory Grey (formerly 8Bit Cynics), Jabee, Josh Sallee, Norman Chamber Music Composers Showcase, SoYé

Zanzibar Stage: Caravact, Hydrants, Magnificent Bird, Syloken, Taylor Atkinson Band, The Gussissin, Tim Jennings

Sunday Lineup

Ashtanga Yoga Studio Stage: DJ Evolve

Blackwatch Stage: Chrome Pony, Colourmusic

2012

The 2012 festival, known as NMF5, took place over three days in April from the 26th to 28th.[1] Portugal. The Man was the headliner. Steven White was the festival chairman.

Below is an alphabetized full list of performers and stages for NMF5 taken from the NM5 website.

Thursday Lineup

Bill&Dee's: Ali Harter, An Airbag Saved My Life, Rats Rats Rats, The Gentle Art of Floating, The Chloes, the hex, The Rockettops, Zombie vs. Shark

Blackwatch: Brine Webb, Chud, Jacob Abello

Bluebonnet: Acoustic Ross, Black Canyon, fos, Taylor Rapp, The Antler Thief, The Samurai Conquistadors, Your Mom

Brewhouse: Aliens Vs Robots, Desi and Cody, Dr. Pants, O Fidelis, Paul Benjaman Band, People, People, Wondernaut, Zebre

Garage: DJ Keilo, DJ View, Zone

MerryBelle's: Dj Timmy B

Michalangelo's: Andrew Cullen, Bob Deupree, Craig Swan, Luna Moth, Matthew Stratton, Tom Crider, Tom Marshall - SWAN

Opolis: Brotherbear, Eureeka, Horse Thief, MMOSS, Olivia Tremor Control, Shi++y/Awesome, Woods

Red Room: Chelsey Cope, Dap Dap, FOS, Justin Witte and the Horn Wreckers, Lotta Tuff, Shawn Reidy Musician, Tallows, The Hitt Boyz, The Righs

Sooner Theatre - BradChad Porter, Cameron Buchholtz,  Dan Skaggs, Sklar Brothers, Spencer Hicks

Friday Lineup

Latin Stage: Mexican Institute of Sound (DJ Camilo Lara), Son del barrio, TEKUMBE

Sooner Theatre - Rockumentary - Black Canyon's Crossroad for the Restless (41 min), Rockumentary - Flaming Films: Rock-a-licious short films from the Legendary Flaming Lips (45 min), Rockumentary - The Sh*ttest Movie Ever Made (34 min)

Opolis: Defining Times, Guardant, Student Film, The Nghiems, The Non

Opolis: outdoor - DEERPEOPLE, New Fumes, Peelander Z, Prix Teen

Blackwatch: Burning Hotels, Dead Sea Chior,  The Pretty Black Chains, Refund Division

Bill&Dee's: Billy Joe Winghead, DEBRIS', Early Beat, JUNEBUG SPADE, Porch Mice, Snorlaxx, The Oh Johnny! Girls, The Trading Co.

Bluebonnet: Admirals, Brandon Patrick, Comedy Hour - with Derek Smith, Ivy Mike, Jeramy Westbrook, Nathan Joyer & James Draper, Pilgrim, The Electric Rag Band, The Lily Guild, The Needles, Them Hounds

Brewhouse: Cait Moore, Carousel Revolt, Giraffe Massacre, [PEACH], Scott Fleenor, Slanga & Breezy Burnz, Southbound Productions, The Kamals

OBS Blues Stage: Amy Lee & the Second Line, Dirty Red & the Soul Shakers, Ike Lamb & the Creepers, Wink Burcham

Michalangelo's: Darden Pierce, Farrel Droke, Jerry Brooks, Nathan Brown, Tod J. Barrett

Sonder Jazz Stage: David Leach Trio, Ivan Peña, Kyle Reid and the Low Swingin' Chariots

Anty Shanty/ Dreamer: Amen Dunes, Bloody Knives, Depth & Current, Dikes of Holland, El Paso Hot Button, Psychotic Reaction, The Purple Church

Red Room: Algebra, BitchWizard, Black June Revival, Scabby Itchins, Scales of Motion, the disposables, they stay dead

Guestroom: Copperheads, Easy Lovers, Expo 70, French Inhales, Lizard Police, Lola-Cola, Smithers, True Widow

MerryBelle's: Brianna Gaither, Head Cabinets, Of The Tower, Syloken, The Dead Armadillos, The Rum Fellows

Ashtanga Yoga: Bizar with Jason Dub, Control C, Evolve, Kilter

Garage: 27 Club Karaoke Bash

Saturday Lineup

Main Stage: Crown Imperial, Jacob Fred Jazz Odyssey, Modern Rock Diaries, Other Lives, Portugal. The Man, Privilege, Rainbows Are Free, Red Wanting Blue, Weekend Hustler

Jack Daniels Stage: Alejandro Escovedo, Hayes Carll, John Calvin & Camille Harp, Krystal Keith, Parker Millsap, The Damn Quails, The Giving Tree, The Possum Possee

Wild Prairie Family Park: Alegria Real, OU Steel Drum Band, Student Showcase: McMichael Music, Student Showcase: Norman Music Institute, 
Student Showcase: Sonder Music, Dance & Art, Student Showcase: The Studio of the Sooner Theatre, Sugar Free Allstars, 
Throughout The day - Activities : Facepainting, Rock Star Hair Spray, Instrument Playground, Wacky Science, Art Projects, Library Fun, Artwork On Display

Sooner Theatre - Allie Lauren, And There Stand Empires, Bungalouski, Caravact, Montu, The Moai Broadcast, The Panda Resistance, The Wurly Birds

Opolis: Beau Jennings, Carly Gwin, Jeff Richardson, John Calvin, Josh Berwanger and Ricky Salthouse, Lounge Record After Party, Sheree Chamberlin, Tim Miser

Blackwatch: Beau Jennings & The Tigers, Broncho, Chrome Pony, Dad, Denver Duncan, Evangelicals, Feathered Rabbit, Locust Avenue

Bill&Dee's: Comedy Hour - with James Nghiem, Zach Smith, Rundus, Justin Smith, Ryan Drake, & Brian Stephens, Dadrock, Dustin Prinz, FoReVeR BLoWiNG BuBBLeS, ManHammer, 
Moon, Klipspringer, Love Button, Tandaradei, The Boom Bang, The Fabulous St. Knicholas Cage, Traindodge, 
 
Bluebonnet: Gregg Standridge, Jessey General Thompson, Juds Routine, Kick Nancy Down, Rainbows Are Free (after party), Taddy Porter, The Del Toros, The Great America Jug Band, 
The Gunship (after party), The Venditos

Brewhouse: Blake Fischer, Good Morning Grizzly, gum, Maggie McClure, Magnificent Bird, Ryan Lawson and the Hack & Saw Nation, Shane Henry, SoYe, Tony Romanello and the Black Jackets,
Van Risseghem

Michalangelo's: acoustic entertainment, Barling, Colin Ryan, Jerrod Beck, Kyle Reid, Local Honey

Michalangelo's Outdoors: Christophe and The Prairie Fire, Crown Folley, Jim Madsen & the Big Train String Quartet, Radio Apathy, Richard 'Daddy' Love, Rosa,
Tanner Miller, The Consumed, The Dizzy Pickers, Tim Jennings + Friends

Anty Shanty/ Dreamer: Brother Gruesome, Bungalouski, Economy, Fishboy, Limp Wizurdz, Regg, Skating Polly, The Pizza Thieves

Red Room: aDDLib, Behind the Bleachers, Jabee, Josh Sallee, L.T.Z, MuGen (Music Genius) Crew, Yung O

MerryBelle's: Along Came a Robot, Brando, DJ Daleth, DJ Jonny Tsunami, Ironix, Mayhem, NMF5 After party featuring DJ Timmy B and DJ Yung2k, Panache One, Steve Morton  
 
Ashtanga Yoga: Doohickey, Sick Nick, Steve Morton, This Guy That Guy

Garage: Beety Man, Dewey Binns, DJ Blev, DJ Werewulf, Josh Sallee, Myke Brown, Roosh Williams,

Bienvenuti's Classical Stage: Boulevard Brass Quintet, Clarinet & Violin Duo, Crouse Quartet, Norman High School Musicians, OK Mozart Presents Kyle Dillingham, 
OU Guitar Ensemble, Singing Sooners

Spectacle Stage: Bang Bang, Carnevolve with Ouija and the Uninauts, Carrie Leslie Modern Dance, Carnevolve Circus Jam Juggling Hooping Unicycling

See also
 Diversafest
 List of music festivals

References

External links
 Norman Music Festival

Music festivals in Oklahoma
Tourist attractions in Cleveland County, Oklahoma
Norman, Oklahoma